Johan Jaco Londt (born 27 November 1984) is a South African politician who serves as a permanent delegate to the National Council of Provinces. He has held the office since May 2019 and previously held it from May 2014 until September 2018. He is a member of the Western Cape provincial delegation. Between September 2018 and May 2019, he served as a member of the National Assembly. Londt is a member of the Democratic Alliance (DA). He was chairperson of the party's east region in the Western Cape from 2015 to 2020.

Early life
Londt was born on 27 November 1984 in Oudtshoorn in the former Cape Province.  His parents were farmers. He first studied mathematics at the University of Pretoria, before changing it to psychology. Due to financial circumstances, he could not finish the course. In 2006, he was employed as a media officer at the Mpumalanga Provincial Legislature. Londt was appointed the provincial director of the Democratic Alliance in 2008.

Political career
Londt was elected to parliament following the 2014 general election that was held on 7 May. He was appointed as one of the Western Cape's delegates in the National Council of Provinces and took office on 22 May. He was elected chairperson of the DA's East Region of the Western Cape in 2015. Londt was re-elected for a second term as chair in 2017. On 7 September 2018, Londt was appointed to the National Assembly. He served in the chamber for only eight months before being appointed back to the NCOP after the general election held on 8 May 2019. He took office on 23 May 2019.

In 2020, Londt stood down as regional chairperson and Tertuis Simmers was elected to succeed him. Londt subsequently declared that he was a candidate to replace Anton Bredell as the DA provincial chairperson. He was elected at the party's virtual provincial congress on 21 November 2020.

Personal life
Londt is engaged to Zimbabwean expatriate Dorcas Dube. Their wedding was delayed due to the COVID-19 pandemic. He was previously married to Lize Londt.

References

External links
Mr Johan Jaco Londt – People's Assembly
Mr Johan Jaco Londt – Parliament of South Africa

Living people
1984 births
People from Knysna Local Municipality
Afrikaner people
Democratic Alliance (South Africa) politicians
Members of the National Assembly of South Africa
Members of the National Council of Provinces